Kenjo Stankov Janković (Serbian cyrillic: Кењо Станков Јанковић; 1797 in Ceklin – 12 May 1861 in Ceklin) was a Montenegrin warrior and military leader. Janković is most notable for leading a small band of Montenegrin rebels which captured the Ottoman-occupied town of Žabljak Crnojevića on two occasions, in 1835 and 1852.

Biography 
Janković was born in 1797 in the village of Rvaši in Ceklin, to father Stanko and mother Bistra. He was a Montenegrin rebel and military leader of the Montenegrin Ceklin clan, which faced constant clashes with nearby Ottoman Sanjak of Scutari, first taking up arms at the age of 17, and continuing his guerilla activity until the end of his life. His most notable achievements were two successful invasions of the fortified town of Žabljak Crnojevića, which his company occupied in 1835 and 1852. For his achievements he was decorated with the Obilić medal, the highest military decoration in Montenegro at the time.

Legacy 

Janković was buried in his home village of Rvaši, where Prince Nikola I erected a monument to his memory in 1874. Monument to Janković and other rebels who liberated Žabljak Crnojevića on two occasions was erected in the town.

References 

1797 births
1861 deaths
Montenegrin soldiers
Military personnel from Cetinje
People of the Principality of Montenegro